Oleo is an album by American jazz saxophonist Lee Konitz's Trio recorded in early 1975 and released on the Sonet label.

Critical reception

Scott Yanow of Allmusic said "In general the improvisations are quite relaxed and thoughtful and, although the results are not all that essential, the altoist's fans will find much to enjoy during these fine performances".

Track listing 
 "Weaver of Dreams" (Jack Elliott, Victor Young) 
 "I Want a Little Girl"  (Billy Moll, Murray Mencher)
 "Invitation" (Bronisław Kaper, Paul Francis Webster) 
 "I Remember Clifford" (Benny Golson) 
 "Oleo" (Sonny Rollins)
 "St. Thomas" (Rollins)
 "No Greater Love" (Isham Jones, Marty Symes)
 "Lushlife" (Billy Strayhorn)

Personnel 
Lee Konitz - alto saxophone, soprano saxophone
Dick Katz - piano, electric piano
Wilbur Little - double bass

References 

Lee Konitz albums
1975 albums
Sonet Records albums